Nutshell is the 14th novel by English author and screenwriter Ian McEwan published in 2016. It retells William Shakespeare's play Hamlet from the point of view of an unborn child, and is set in 2015.

Origins
Interviewing McEwan for The Wall Street Journal, Michael W. Miller explained: "The idea for the extremely unusual narrator of Ian McEwan's new novel Nutshell first came to him while he was chatting with his pregnant daughter-in-law. 'We were talking about the baby, and I was very much aware of the baby as a presence in the room,' he recalls. He jotted down a few notes, and soon afterward, daydreaming in a long meeting, the first sentence of the novel popped into his head: 'So here I am, upside down in a woman.'"

Critical reception
Nutshell received generally positive reviews from book critics. Book Marks, the review aggregator of Literary Hub, assigned the book an average grade of B+. In The Guardian, Kate Clanchy began by admitting: "This may not sound like an entirely promising read: a talking foetus could be an unconvincing or at least tiresomely limited narrator, and updatings of Shakespeare often strain at their own seams. From the start, though, McEwan manages to establish both the groggy, gripping parameters of the uterus—'My limbs are folded hard across my chest, my head is wedged into my only exit. I wear my mother like a tight-fitting cap'—and that this foetus, Hamlet-style, is 'king of infinite space'".  She found the book's retelling of Hamlet to have "a strong forward momentum" and to be not only a "brutally effective" thriller, "but many other sorts of book too". Despite finding some faults with the novel's social satire, characterisation, and portrayal of contemporary life, she concluded that "... the architecture wins. This book is organised so thoroughly, in its plot, characters and themes, around the central image of the foetus suspended in the churnings of gravity and time [...]. Like TS Eliot's "Marina", also a riff on Shakespeare, it is a consciously late, deliberately elegiac, masterpiece, a calling together of everything McEwan has learned and knows about his art."

Also writing for The Guardian, Tim Adams noted: "There have been plenty of novels inspired by Hamlet—Iris Murdoch's The Black Prince, John Updike's Gertrude and Claudius, even David Foster Wallace's Infinite Jest. And there have been one or two novels told in the voice of foetuses in the womb—Carlos Fuentes's Christopher Unborn, for example. But Ian McEwan's virtuoso entertainment is almost certainly the first to combine the two." He added, "Biology was always Hamlet's destiny—'The time is out of joint. Oh cursed spite, that ever I was born to set it right'—but never has it seemed quite so graphically chromosomal." Adams found the book to be "both alive with wild and whirling wordplay and capable of all sorts of antic dispositions" but warned that "As with all novels based on self-consciously clever conceits, the danger is always self-consciously clever conceit".

The Financial Times}s Christopher Tayler judged that "The central gimmick, however, is that the novel is narrated from inside the Gertrude-figure's womb by her nearly due and highly loquacious son. [... A]nd what follows is clearly generated by the technical challenges implicit in the opening sentence, rather than a story that McEwan urgently needs to tell." He decided that "Interspersed throughout the text are extended soliloquies on the general theme of 'the time is out of joint'. Global warming, the erosion of Enlightenment values, the rise of competing nationalisms: the narrator has heard about all these, and more, thanks to Trudy's love of the World Service. ... As you'd expect, these musings are fitted into McEwan's now-standard dramatic opposition between muddled artiness and cold rationality, and injected with a dose of irony. But there's no mistaking Nutshell for a young man's novel." Whilst judging McEwan to be "a master of suspense to just about keep a reader wondering how he's going to resolve the new book's murder plot without doing too much violence to his source material", Tayler concluded that "... the high-wire act doesn’t really come off. McEwan's usual strengths—imaginative precision, narrative placement and control of story dynamics—can make even slim works like On Chesil Beach (2007) oddly resonant. Nutshell relies instead on pure voice and quickly collapses into a mishmash of pentameter-ridden sentences and half-baked wordplay."

John Boyne writing in The Irish Times judged Nutshell to be McEwan's "most intriguing book since that novella [On Chesil Beach], recalling the darker short stories of his early career, the illicit family relationships that make up The Cement Garden, and the complex and deceitful relationships between men and women that lie at the heart of The Comfort of Strangers."

References

2016 British novels
Fiction set in 2015
Jonathan Cape books
Modern adaptations of works by William Shakespeare
Novels based on Hamlet
Novels by Ian McEwan
Novels set in London